Fisher Point is a rock coastal point on the east margin of the Darley Hills, in the Churchill Mountains of Antarctica. The point marks the south side of the mouth of ice-filled Grazzini Bay at the Ross Ice Shelf. It was named by the Advisory Committee on Antarctic Names after Franklin L. Fisher, Chief of the Illustrations Division, National Geographic Magazine (NGM), about 1905–49; this is one of several features in the Darley Hills that are named for NGM staff.

References 

Headlands of the Ross Dependency
Shackleton Coast